"Ella Quiere Beber" is a song by Anuel AA and Romeo Santos, released in November 2018. This is the remix of Anuel AA's song "Quiere Beber", which was featured on his album Real Hasta la Muerte.

Music video
The video of "Ella Quiere Beber" was released alongside the song. As of September 2019, the music video overall has over 685 million views on YouTube.

Charts

Weekly charts

Year-end charts

Decade-end charts

Certifications

|-
!colspan="4"|Remix only
|-

See also
List of Billboard number-one Latin songs of 2019

References

2018 singles
2018 songs
Anuel AA songs
Romeo Santos songs
Spanish-language songs
Songs written by Chris Jedi
Songs written by Anuel AA
Songs written by Romeo Santos